is a JR West railway station located in Hagi, Yamaguchi Prefecture, Japan.

Adjacent stations

  

Railway stations in Japan opened in 1929
Railway stations in Yamaguchi Prefecture
Sanin Main Line
Stations of West Japan Railway Company